John Frewen was a Royal Navy officer.

John Frewen may also refer to:

John Frewen (divine) (1558–1628), English divine
John Frewen (general), Australian Army general
John Frewen-Turner (1755–1829), born John Frewen, English landowner and politician